The men's 50 metre freestyle event at the 2001 World Aquatics Championships was held on 22 (heats and semifinals) and 23 July 2001 at the Fukuoka, Japan.

Results

Heats

Semifinals

Final

References

Swimming at the 2001 World Aquatics Championships